Line Walker ( literally "Apostle Walker") is a 2014 Hong Kong crime thriller drama produced by TVB, starring Michael Miu, Charmaine Sheh and Raymond Lam as the main leads, with Sharon Chan, Benz Hui, Elena Kong, Sammy Sum, Oscar Leung and Toby Leung in major supporting roles. It is the first entry in the franchise.

The drama began broadcasting on August 25 to October 3, 2014, on TVB Jade channel during its 9:30–10:30 p.m. timeslot. In 2022, the drama was selected as one of ten classic TVB dramas being honoured for a new joint Youku and TVB programme.

Plot 
Set in Hong Kong, the drama follows the lives of Hong Kong Police's CIB undercover police agents who must live a double life in secrecy. Not knowing when they can return to their normal life, they must also endure the constant fear of being uncovered by those they are assigned to infiltrate. However, this time their lives are put in danger when it is discovered that a mole lives within the police force.

Cheuk Hoi (Michael Miu) is a Chief Inspector of Police (CIP) in Hong Kong Police's Criminal Intelligence Bureau (CIB) unit. He is a righteous supervisor that will resort to unofficial tactics in order to restore the identities of his undercover subordinates who have gone missing and deemed by the police department to have strayed to the criminal side. When he finds his friend Hong To Hang, a fellow Superintendent of Police (SP) in the CIB unit, thrown off a building under mysterious circumstances, he learns from Hong's dying words that there are moles within the police force working for the triads. In order to protect the lives of his five undercover agents, Hong has deleted their files from the police database, erasing their identities as police officers. Hong charges Hoi with the task of finding each lost undercover agent, but dies before he can tell Hoi any further information. Remembering Hong's warning against trusting anyone in the police force, Hoi keeps Hong's last words hidden from his superiors. Instead, he sets out on his own to find Hong's five undercover agents.

With clues left behind by Hong, Hoi finds undercover agent Ting Siu Ka (Charmaine Sheh) who fronts as an owner of a foot massage parlor, and assumes his role as her new handler. Siu Ka's only assignment under Hong was to gather intelligence but Hoi assigns her the task of helping him find the other four undercover agents. Siu Ka decides to get close to Sit Ka Keung (Raymond Lam), nicknamed Bao Seed who is part of an illegal gambling gang. He fronts as an ice deliveryman but is actually in charge of collecting unpaid gambling debts. Siu Ka previously clashed with Bao Seed and his partner Muk Sut when they went to her shop to collect a gambling debt but becomes friendly with them because she knows of their connection to a major triad organization.

Meanwhile, Kobe Lin Ho Kan (Sammy Sum), another undercover agent working for Hong, fronted as a crooked stock broker in order to go to prison and get close to triad boss Chum Foon Hei as the last assignment he received from Hong, but Foon Hei soon proved to be a cunning target. Unable to gain any traction with Foon Hei, Kobe believed he had failed his assignment. However upon Kobe's release from prison, Foon Hei asks Kobe to join his organization. In order for Kobe to follow through with his undercover assignment, Kobe sacrifices his relationship with ICAC officer Mok Sin Yan (Sharon Chan), who is unaware that Kobe is an undercover agent.

Yan investigates Hoi because she suspects that he is a dirty cop with connections to the triads because of his fast raise in the police force and all the cases he is assigned to as the Chief inspector gets foiled. With Yan tracking his every single move, it makes things complicated for Hoi to meet up with the undercover agents. In order to keep one step ahead, Hoi bugs Yan's personal belongings and overhears her personal life. Accidentally he discovers the abusive marital life of Yan's older sister Katie Mok Sin Ching (Elena Kong). While helping Katie to escape her abusive life, the two begin to get closer and eventually begin a relationship.

As Siu Ka continues to work with Bao Seed on missions for Foon Hei, she begins to develop feelings for Bao Seed. It is eventually revealed that Bao Seed is another undercover sent out by Hong. As the 3 undercover agents work together with Hoi, they start to suspect their handler is the mole; however, the 4th undercover, Ada (Skye Chan), was revealed and explained to them her relationship with Hong and Hong's intentions.

When Foon Hei's son dies from the karma of his bad deeds, Foon Hei began to change for the better. Hoi begins to suspect Yip Siu-leung (Patrick Tang) as the mole in the police force. Kobe warns Yan to be careful. At first Yan dismisses Kobe's warning as an act of jealousy; however, she decides to investigate on her own and finds evidence to confirm Hoi's suspicions. Siu-leung eventually finds Yan investigating him. Hurt and enraged, he decides to kill Yan who is saved by Kobe when he tackles Siu-leung off the roof of a building.

Cast

Main cast

Supporting cast

Hung Ying triad society 
Eddie Pang 彭懷安 as Yau Tat-fu 游達富, also known as "Taat Sa" (Flounder) 撻沙. Died in an explosion in episode 8
Eddie Law 羅天池 as Lok Wai-na (Rottweiler) 洛威拿. Died in lockup.
Eddie Ho 何偉業 as Gwai Wong Chiu 鬼王超. Died in lockup.
Akai Lee 李啟傑 as Lee Kai-shing 李繼承, also known as "Chicken Shing" 雞成. Captured by the police in episode 1.
Owen Cheung 張振朗 as Ah Fo "Fire" 阿火
 Vincent Lam 林偉 as Chai Fing 猜Fing. Shot to death.
Kitterick Yiu 姚浩政 as Ah Gau "Dog" 阿狗. Died becoming dog food.
 Otto Chan 陳志健 as Cheung Yung 張勇
Kelvin Lee 李興華 as Tat-fu's gang member 游達富之下屬
Choco Ip 葉家泓 as Tat-fu's gang member 游達富之下屬

Criminal Intelligence Bureau (CIB) 
Lau Kong 劉江 as Kwok Hok-wah 郭學華, Chief Superintendent of Police (CSP) and head of CIB. Revealed to be a corrupt cop in episode 21. Member of Mr. Song Society. Gets arrested by the constables in episode 24, Committed suicide during Cheuk Hoi interrogation visit in episode 25.
Jimmy Au 歐瑞偉 as Hong To-hang 康道行, CIB Superintendent of Police (SP). Killed when pushed off a building in episode 1.
Skye Chan 陳倩揚 as Ada Tse On-yee 謝安儀, ICAC Investigator and undercover Police Constable. Killed in episode 19 by Yip Siu Leung
Nicole Wan 尹詩沛 as Yeung Wing-sze 楊詠絲, CIB officer
Kelvin Chan 陳建文 as Pong Tsz-kit 龐志傑, CIB officer
Lau Tin Lung 劉天龍 as Ng Wai-kwong 伍偉光, CIB officer

Organized Crime and Triad Bureau (OCTB) 
Patrick Tang 鄧健泓 as Marco Yip Siu-leung 葉兆良, OCTB Chief Inspector of Police (CIP), becomes CIB Superintendent of Police (SP) in episode 18. Revealed to be a member of Mr. Song Society and corrupt police officer in episode 14. After falling off a building together with Lin-Ho Kan and gravely injured in episode 19, he was killed by a dirty cop in episode 20.
Raymond Tsang 曾守明 as Lee Yat-shan 李日山
Jayden Kau Cheuk-nang 裘卓能 as Ching Yik-hei 程亦熙
Edgar Lam 林健生 as Mak Tsz-kit 麥子健
Leung Yan 梁茵 as Chung Chi-nei 鍾芷妮
Chloe Nguyen 阮兒 as Fung Ka-ling 馮嘉玲

Independent Commission Against Corruption (ICAC) 
Miguel Choi 蔡康年 as Ko Chin-nang 高展能
Mak Ka Lun 麥嘉倫 as Law Chun-yip 羅俊業
Moses Cheng 鄭詠謙 as Man Yan-chung 文仁松
Ng Kwong Lei 吳曠利 as Chow Lok-hei 周樂晞

Foot Massage parlour 
Mary Hon 韓馬利 as Rose Fung Wai-fong 馮慧芳, Ting Siu-ka's Foster Mother, shot in episode 25.
Rosanne Lui 呂珊 as Nancy Lau Mei-ying 劉美鶯, Ting Siu-ka's Foster Mother, shot in episode 25.
Ceci So 蘇恩磁 as Susie Choi Siu-lin 蔡笑蓮, Ting Siu-ka's Foster Mother, shot in episode 25.

Thai Mafia 
KK Cheung 張國強 as Sung Kam 崇金
Ankie Beilke 貝安琪 as Amrin On Lam 安琳
Yuang Cheung 章宇昂 as Ah Yum 阿鑫

Mr Song Society 
Chung King-fai 鍾景輝 as Chin Shui-on 錢瑞安, former Hong Kong Secretary of Security, mastermind behind Mr. Song's group. Gets arrested and sentenced to life in prison in episode 31.
Stephen Huynh 黃長興 as James Pong Yin Ting 龐彥廷, also known as Mr. Song 宋先生, killed in episode 29.
Samantha Ko 高海寧 as Amy Lam Hei-mei 林希微, Undercover Agent and later turned black cop, killed in episode 29.
Sam Tsang 曾航生 as Kelvin Lok Kei 骆祺, a barrister who represents dirty cops and Mr Song's group members.
Law Lok-lam 羅樂林 as Keith Kwok Teng 郭正, Director of Public Prosecutions inside Department of Justice, and one of the masterminds of Mr Song's group, Gets arrested by the police in episode 30.

Others 
Ken Law 羅浩銘 as Ah Tong 阿棠
Kenneth Fok 霍健邦 as Ying Ka-moon 刑家滿
Doris Chow 周麗欣 as Ho Wan-ying 何韵
Steven Ho 何啟南 as Richard Cheung Wing-kuen 張永權
Gemma Choi 蔡慧欣 as Richard Cheung's mistress 張永權之情婦
Alvin Lau 劉彥夆 as Chum Long Sing 覃朗星

Development and casting 
The sales presentation clip was filmed in October 2013. The original 57 second clip featured Michael Miu, Charmaine Sheh, Raymond Lam, Sharon Chan, Elena Kong, Sammy Leung and KK Cheung. The sales presentation clip was unveiled on November 7, 2013, for 2014 drama sales pitch.
Movie king Tony Leung Ka-fai was originally cast in the drama, but had to withdraw due to a rib injury sustained during filming of Horse Play. A whole new script was written as a result.
Costume fitting was held on February 28, 2014.
The blessing ceremony took place on February 28, 2014, 2:00 p.m. at Tseung Kwan O TVB City
Sammy Leung was originally cast to play the role "Lin Ho Kan", but had to withdraw during the middle of filming due to health reasons. Sammy Sum replaced him, while Patrick Tang took on Sammy Sum's original role "Yip Siu Leung". With Sammy Sum taking over the role of "Lin Ho Kan", Sharon Chan had to re-film scenes with Sammy Sum that she had already filmed with Sammy Leung which caused production to be pushed back for a month.
Joe Ma was rumoured to have been offered the role of "Lin Ho Kan". Once it was confirmed that the role was given to Sammy Sum, Joe released a statement on his Weibo account and stated during an interview with a reporter that he had turned down the role because "it was not fitting" for him. However, producer Man Wai Hung later clarified that he never contacted Joe about the role and did not understand where such a rumour came from.
On March 18, 2014, while filming a motorcycle scene, Sammy Sum fell and landed on his right hand which resulted to a wrist fracture. Medical attention was required and Sum was admitted to the hospital for surgery on March 21. Filming was delayed by a few weeks while Sum recovered.
On March 24, 2014, an extended trailer of the drama was previewed at FILMART 2014.

Reception 
The series has received overwhelming critical acclaim since its release particularly for the suspenseful plot, buzz-generating episodes, performances by the casts, and direction. It is also one of the highest rated TVB series of the year, and is the most watched TVB drama of the year. The click rate of this drama has hit 2 billion online in Mainland China, breaking the record of Triumph in the Skies 2 and becoming the highest click rate TVB drama in Mainland China. The series has won Singapore's Media Favourite Series in StarHub TVB Awards 2014, Most Favourite Series in TVB Star Awards Malaysia 2014 and Best Drama in Hong Kong's TVB 48th Anniversary Awards 2014.

The starring cast also won multiple awards for their performances in this drama. Charmaine Sheh was highly praised for her role as "Ting Siu Ka" (丁小嘉). She won both Best/Favourite Actress and My Favourite TV Character at the TVB Anniversary Awards 2014, the TVB Star Awards Malaysia 2014 and the StarHub TVB Awards 2014 in Singapore. This is her second time to be crowned double TV Queen of the year at the TVB Anniversary Awards. The character "Chum Foon Hei" (覃歡喜) was very liked by the audience and "Foon Hei Gor" (歡喜哥) has become a new nickname for Benz Hui. He won My Favourite TV character in Hong Kong and in Malaysia. At Singapore's TVB award show, he won My Favourite Supporting Actor. Other cast members, like Raymond Lam, Michael Miu, Sharon Chan and Sammy Sum were also awarded at the different TVB Award shows. The subtheme "Love Is Not Easy" (越難越愛), sung by Jinny Ng, won the first Most Popular Series Song at the TVB Anniversary Award.

The series' success has led to two TV sequels and two spinoff movies.

Viewership ratings

Awards and nominations 

TVB Anniversary Awards 2014
Best Drama (won by 61.90%)
Best Actress: Charmaine Sheh (won by 78.60%)
My Favourite Female Character: Charmaine Sheh as Ting Siu Ka 丁小嘉  (75171 votes)
My Favourite Male Character: Benz Hui as Chum Foon Hei 覃歡喜 (62705 votes)
Most Popular Series Song: "Love Is Not Easy" 越難越愛 by Jinny Ng (42935 votes)
Nominated – Best Actor: Michael Miu (Top 15)
Nominated – Best Actor: Raymond Lam (Top 15)
Nominated – Best Supporting Actor: Benz Hui (Top 15)
Nominated – Best Supporting Actor: Oscar Leung (Top 15)
Nominated – Best Supporting Actress: Sharon Chan (Top 15)
Nominated – Best Supporting Actress: Elena Kong (Top 15)
Nominated – My Favourite Male Character: Michael Miu (Top 15)
Nominated – My Favourite Male Character: Raymond Lam (Top 15)
(No Top 3 or Top 5 were announced)

TVB Star Awards Malaysia 2014
Most Favourite Drama
Most Favourite Leading Actress: Charmaine Sheh
Most Favourite Supporting Actor: Benz Hui
Most Favourite Supporting Actress: Sharon Chan
Most Favourite Improved Actor: Sammy Sum
Most Favourite Improved Actress: Samantha Ko
Most Favourite Theme Song: "Love Is Not Easy" 越難越愛 by Jinny Ng
Top 15 Favourite TV Characters: Charmaine Sheh as Ting Siu Ka 丁小嘉
Top 15 Favourite TV Characters: Michael Miu as Cheuk Hoi 卓凱
Top 15 Favourite TV Characters: Raymond Lam as Sit Ka Keung 薛家強
Top 15 Favourite TV Characters: Benz Hui as Chum Foon Hei 覃歡喜
Top 15 Favourite TV Characters: Sharon Chan as Mok Sin Yan 莫羨昕
Nominated – Most Favourite Leading Actor: Raymond Lam (Top 3)
Nominated – Most Favourite Supporting Actress: Elena Kong (Top 12)
Nominated – Most Favourite Supporting Actor: Oscar Leung (Top 12)
Nominated – Most Favourite On-Screen Couple: Raymond Lam and Charmaine Sheh (Top 3)

Singapore StarHub TVB Awards 2014
My Favourite TVB Actress: Charmaine Sheh
Top 6 Favourite TVB Female Characters: Charmaine Sheh as Ting Siu Ka 丁小嘉
Singapore Media's Favourite TVB Drama
Nominated – My Favourite TVB Drama
Nominated – My Favourite TVB Actor: Michael Miu 
Nominated – My Favourite TVB Supporting Actor: Oscar Leung
Nominated – My Favourite TVB Male TV Characters: Raymond Lam (Top 12)

Yahoo！Asia Buzz Awards 2014
Searched Popularity Award TV Drama
Searched Popularity Award TV Actress: Charmaine Sheh
Searched Popularity Award Male Artist: Benz Hui

Taiwan TVBS
The Most Favourite Hong Kong Drama 2014

Huading 15th Awards 2015
Best Chinese Actor in a TV Series: Raymond Lam
Best Chinese Actress in a TV Series: Charmaine Sheh

Weibo's Star 2014 
Weibo's Powerful TV Drama
Hong Kong Top 10 Hot Topic: 9th Place
Weibo's Powerful TV Female Character: Charmaine Sheh as Ting Siu Ka 丁小嘉
Weibo's Powerful On-Screen Couple: Charmaine Sheh (as Ting Siu Ka 丁小嘉) and Raymond Lam (as Sit Ka Keung 薛家強)
Weibo's Powerful TV Theme Song: "Love Is Not Easy" 越難越愛 by Jinny Ng

References

External links 
Official Website
K-TVB.net

TVB dramas
Hong Kong television series
Hong Kong action television series
2014 Hong Kong television series debuts
2014 Hong Kong television series endings
2010s Hong Kong television series
Triad (organized crime)
Television shows adapted into films